Sati narayani(नारायणी माता) belongs to Sain Samaj (Nayee Samaj) and morwal Gotra's Kuldevi.
अखिल भारतीय श्री नारायणी धाम प्रबन्ध ट्रस्ट महासभा समिति
One On the edge of Sariska National Park, 14 kilometres from Amanbagh is Narayani Mata temple.  This is the most sacred pilgrimage site for the people of India, especially of sain samaj, its sanctity is matched only by Pushkar and Mount Abu.

According to legend, Narayani Mata is the site of the first Sati (immolation by fire) in Northern India before rani sati. The legend states that When Narayani was going to her marital house for the first time,, a snake bit her husband in midway of the alter that resulted into the death of her husband. Narayani was so stricken with grief that she knelt in prayer beside her husband's unlit funeral pyre and seek the permission of Lord Shiva to put an end to her life and join with her husband in life after death. Such was her devotion to Lord Shiva and so fervent her wish to join her dead husband, that Shiva sent his holy fire to consume them both. 

Marking the site is a holy spring - an unusual source of water in a semi-desert land - that acts as a draw to colourfully dressed pilgrims offering their puja to Narayani Mata's main Shiva temple. The priest of this temple belongs to sain caste. Some people also say that Narayani sati and Rani sati both are same. Since caste sain has been made this temple, anybody are allowed to enter in this temple.

As per history of Maa Narayani sati is the avtar of Mata Sati, the first wife of Lord Shive.
Once Sati's father (Raja Daksha) announced a big Yagya, He invited all gods, except Lord Shiva with an intention to insult him. When Sati gets to know about this she becomes angry. Still Sati went to the yagya without invitation, as she thought it's my father's event so I won't need an invitation. There in front of all gods, Sati's father meet her daughter and criticize her for coming without being invited. He even insult her husband Lord Shiva. Sati, unable to bear her husband's insult anymore, invoked Yogagni to sacrifice herself. Since it was yogagni, the body was not burnt and Shiva carried it along with him throughout the universe after punishing Daksha. Vishnu's sudarshan chakra followed Shiva and tore the body into pieces. These pieces fell at different places and those places later came to known as "Shakti Peethas".One such place is of Maa Narayani Sati.

Before 1993 every year big fair was organised by local peoples. But Prime Minister Of India Late Mr Rajeev Gandhi has banned it while in office.

Local People and Sain samaj peoplehave tried many times to meet with upper authorities but they are unable to restart the fair.

References
https://secure.amanresorts.com/amanbagh/historical_trails.aspx
Hindu pilgrimage sites in India

नारायणी माता का मंदिर का इतिहास हिन्दी में

कर्मावती कौन थीं और कैसे बन गई नारायणी, जानिये

https://www.sainindia.com/narayani-mata-ke-katha/